Rüsselsheim station is a transit station in the town of Rüsselsheim in the German state of Hesse on the Main Railway from Mainz to Frankfurt am Main. It is classified by Deutsche Bahn as a category 3 station. The station is served by the Rhine-Main S-Bahn and by regional trains. There is another station in Rüsselsheim, Rüsselsheim-Opelwerk station, which is served by S-Bahn trains only.

The station was opened in 1863. The Rüsselsheim train disaster occurred near the station on 2 February 1990, killing 17 persons and severely injuring 145.

Services
Rüsselsheim lies in the area served by the Rhein-Main-Verkehrsverbund (Rhine-Main Transport Association, RMV). It is used by Rhine-Main S-Bahn trains operated by DB Regio and buses.

Trains
Services on lines S8 and S9 each operate at 30-minute intervals on the Wiesbaden Hauptbahnhof–Hanau Hauptbahnhof route. Together the two lines operate at 15-minute intervals through Rüsselsheim. Line S8 runs through Mainz Hauptbahnhof to Wiesbaden Hauptbahnhof, while line S9 runs via Kostheim Bridge to Mainz-Kastel and Wiesbaden Hauptbahnhof.

Rüsselsheim station is also served by Regional-Express trains running between Koblenz Hauptbahnhof and Frankfurt (the Mittelrhein-Main-Express, RE 2) and between Saarbrücken Hauptbahnhof and Frankfurt (Rhein-Nahe-Express, RE 3), each running every two hours, resulting in an approximately hourly service as far as Mainz. In the peak hours there are a few Regionalbahn services to Idar-Oberstein and to Bingen Hauptbahnhof.

Buses 

Rüsselsheim station has a large bus station. It is served by city bus routes 6, 11, 31, 32, 41, 42, 51, and 52, and regional bus line 1 to Flörsheim (Main) station. Rüsselsheim Bahnhof Südseite bus stop to the south of the station is served by routes L1, 22, 24, 28, 72, and 752.

Notes

Rhine-Main S-Bahn stations
Railway stations in Hesse
Railway stations in Germany opened in 1863
Station
Buildings and structures in Groß-Gerau (district)